Sedige Sedu (Kannada: ಸೇಡಿಗೆ ಸೇಡು) is a 1970 Indian Kannada film, directed by A. V. Sheshagiri Rao and produced by K. Krishnaiah Naidu. The film stars Udaykumar, Jayanthi, T. N. Balakrishna and Narasimharaju in the lead roles. The film has musical score by Chellapilla Satyam.

Cast
Udaykumar
Jayanthi
T. N. Balakrishna
Narasimharaju
B. Ramadevi

Soundtrack
The music was composed by Satyam.

References

External links
 

1970 films
1970s Kannada-language films
Films scored by Satyam (composer)